Gojan-dong is a neighborhood of Danwon-gu, Ansan, Gyeonggi Province, South Korea. It is officially divided into Gojan-1-dong and Gojan-2-dong. It is an important administrative point located in the center of Ansan, and is a densely formed area of institutions at various levels of the city. It is also a multi-family housing, officetel, and town complex complex residential area.

History 
In the joseon dynasty, This place was Ansan Imhwameon Gojan-ri area. In 1914, the administrative district was changed to Gozan-ri, Suam-myeon, Siheung-gun. In 1986, it changed to An-san-Jung-dong. In 1988, Jungang-dong was divided into Gozan-1, Gozan-2, and Sungpo-dong. In 2003, the southern area where the population increased due to the move to Gozan New Town, Currently, the administrative district is composed of Gozan 1, Gozan 2, and Hosu Dong.

The natural villages of Gojan-dong before the closing of the building include Dori Island, Chilban, Gojan Station, Plaintiffjan, and Jeokgeumgoeul, and the following legends are handed down in Jeokgeumgoeul.

"A long time ago, an old woman lived in this village with her two sons. The old woman gave a prayer to Seonghwangdang, which she had brought to the ridge in front of her house for a year to help her two sons do well, and when the old monk appeared in her dream and dug the ground as told, gold came out."

Since then, it is said that this village began to be called Jeokgeum, and after that, numerous people visited the mountain in the north of the village and dug up to mine gold.

References

External links
 Gojan-1-dong 
 Gojan-2-dong 
Hosu-dong (in Korean)

Danwon-gu
Neighbourhoods in Ansan